USS LST-47 was a  in the United States Navy during World War II. She was transferred to the Philippine Navy as BRP Tarlac (LT-500).

Construction and career 
LST-47 was laid down on 30 July 1943 at Dravo Corporation, Neville Island, Pennsylvania. Launched on 24 September 1943 and commissioned on 8 November 1944.

Service in the United States Navy 
During World War II, LST-47 was assigned to the Europe-Africa-Middle theater but later changed to Asiatic-Pacific theater. She then participated in the Invasion of Normandy from 6 to 25 June 1944.

She participated in the invasion of Okinawa and later took occupation there from 26 to 30 June 1945. She assigned to Occupation service in the Far East from 14 to 25 September 1945, 15 to 25 October 1945 and 25 November 1945 to 11 January 1946.

She was decommissioned on 11 January 1946 and came under the Commander Naval Forces Far East (COMNAVFE) Shipping Control Authority for Japan (SCAJAP), redesignated Q007.

Transferred to the Military Sea Transportation Service (MSTS), 31 March 1952, and placed in service as USNS T-LST-47.

LST-47 was struck from the Navy Register on 30 June 1975 and transferred to the Philippines.

Service in the Philippine Navy 
She was acquired by the Philippine Navy on 13 September 1976 and renamed BRP Tarlac (LST-500).

On 21 September 1981, BRP Datu Kalantiaw (PS-76) was caught in the strong wind and heavy seas thus she ran aground off Calayan Point, Cagayan Valley and flipped to her side. The bad weather was caused by the ongoing Typhoon Clara. On the next day as the weather has recovered, BRP Rajah Lakandula (PF-4), BRP Rizal (PS-69), BRP Tarlac (LT-500), BRP Aurora (LT-508), BRP Mactan (TK90) and USS Mount Hood (AE-29) were dispatched to the scene.

The ship was decommissioned in the late 1980s.

Awards 
LST-47 have earned the following awards:

American Campaign Medal
Combat Action Ribbon
European-Africa-Middle East Campaign Medal (2 battle star)
Asiatic-Pacific Campaign Medal (1 battle star)
Navy Occupation Medal (with Asia clasp)
World War II Victory Medal

Citations

Sources 
 
 
 
 

World War II amphibious warfare vessels of the United States
Ships built in Pittsburgh
1943 ships
LST-1-class tank landing ships of the United States Navy
Ships built by Dravo Corporation
LST-1-class tank landing ships of the Philippine Navy